The 1993 London Marathon was the 13th running of the annual marathon race in London, United Kingdom, which took place on Sunday, 18 April. The elite men's race was won by home athlete Eamonn Martin in a time of 2:10:50 hours and the women's race was won by Germany's Katrin Dörre-Heinig in 2:27:09. 

In the wheelchair races, Belgium's George Vandamme (1:44:10) and Britain's Rose Hill (2:03:05) set course records in the men's and women's divisions, respectively. Vandamme's time was a significant improvement on the old record, knocking over seven and a half minutes off it.

Around 68,000 people applied to enter the race, of which 35,820 had their applications accepted and around 25,000 started the race. A total of 24,495 runners finished the race.

Results

Men

Women

Wheelchair men

Wheelchair women

References

Results
Results. Association of Road Racing Statisticians. Retrieved 2020-04-19.

External links

Official website

1993
London Marathon
Marathon
London Marathon